The National Rice Research Institute has been established since 1966 under Indian Council of Agricultural Research (ICAR) but it was setup on April 23, 1946 at Bidhyadharpur, Cuttack, Odisha with an experimental farm land of 60 hectares.

Research
The institute's scientists have many research results to their credit in various disciplines of rice research, including:
 Biochemistry
 Blue green algae
 Entomology
 Food technology
 Nematology
 Physiology
 Plant breeding and genetics
 Plant pathology and mycology

Site
Many of the scientists are housed on the campus, which includes a co-operative store, co-operative dairy, and a CGHS dispensary. There is also a hostel and in-transit accommodation.

Organisation
The research institute is divided into various departments, each headed by a Departmental Head. After the implementation of the Gajendragadkar Commission report, working conditions (in terms of pay) improved greatly for the research scientists.
Most of the scientists stay in houses in the campus.

Notable staff
Ex-Directors
 Krishnaswami Ramiah - Founder director
 Dr.R.H. Richharia -
 Dr S.Y.Padmanabhan, D.Sc.--Plant Pathologist
 Senior Administrative Officer
 S K Sinha
 Scientists:
 Dr S. S. Jain - Senior Plant Pathologist & Mycologist ( the pioneer scientist who first grew button mushroom in India in laboratory established by him in Solan, Shimla Hills, HP between 1959 and 1961).
 Dr R. N. Misra - Geneticist
 Dr B. K. Rao - Rice Breeder( Winner of Hooker Award)
 Dr M. Seetharaman - Geneticist
 Dr J. P. Kulshreshtha - Entomologist
 Dr Devdath - Plant Pathologist
 Dr P. K. Singh - Algologist
 Dr. S. N. Ratho - Genetics and Plant Breeding
 Dr. Shri Gopal Sharma- CPB Division
 Dr. Onkar Nath Singh- Crop Improvement Division ( Head of Division)
 Mr.Rakesh Kumar Jain, IRS (CE) (1976) (s/o Dr. S.S.Jain) was TA to director (1972–75).

References

External links
 Central Rice Research Institute 

Research institutes in Odisha
Indian Council of Agricultural Research
Rice research institutes
Research institutes established in 1946
1946 establishments in India